Searsia leptodictya is known as mountain karee in English, bergkaree in Afrikaans, and mohlwehlwe in Sotho. An evergreen tree reaching a height of 5 metres and a similar spread, it is drought resistant but only semi frost hardy. It is an attractive small tree with a rounded crown and a pleasing weeping effect. It can be planted in full sun or in  partial shade. The tree bears small white flowers, which on female trees turn into bunches of small berry type fruit, which attract birds who feed on the berries. The tree is an attractive tree for a small garden. The berries can be brewed into a beer.

Gallery

References

External links

leptodictya
Trees of South Africa
Ornamental trees
Drought-tolerant trees
Garden plants of Southern Africa